Chamuvarinin is an acetogenin found in Uvaria chamae.

(+)-Chamuvarinin was synthesized in 2010 by a research group from the University of St Andrews led by Gordon Florence.

References

Furanones
Tetrahydrofurans